A reprisal is a limited and deliberate violation of international law to punish another sovereign state that has already broken them. Since the 1977 Additional Protocol I to the Geneva Conventions (AP 1), reprisals in the laws of war are extremely limited, as they commonly breach the rights of non-combatants.

Etymology
The word came from French, where it originally meant "act of taking back", for example, raiding back the equivalent of cattle lost to an enemy raid.

International law
Reprisals refer to acts which are illegal if taken alone, but become legal when adopted by one state in retaliation for the commission of an earlier illegal act by another state. Counter-reprisals are generally not allowed.

World War I

1914 Portugal-Germany dispute
An example of reprisal is the Naulila dispute between Portugal and Germany in October 1914, when they were on opposite sides of the World War I chasm. After three Germans were mistakenly killed in Naulila on the border of the then-Portuguese colony of Angola (in a manner that did not violate international law), Germany carried out a military raid on Naulila, destroying property in retaliation. A claim for compensation was brought by Portugal. The tribunal emphasized that before reprisals could be legally undertaken, a number of conditions had to be satisfied:
There had to be a previous act by the other party that violated international law.
Reprisals had to be preceded by an unsatisfied demand for reparation or compliance with the violated international law.
There must be proportionality between the offence and reprisal.
The German claim that it had acted lawfully was rejected on all three grounds.

World War II

Bennett writes that the events of World War II can be seen through either the prism of negative reciprocity or the prism of reprisal. If the latter, "the rules also required that reprisals be used ‘only as an unavoidable last resort to induce the enemy to desist from illegitimate practices’".

The official 1940 American Rules of Land Warfare stated that "commanding officers must assume responsibility for retaliative measures when an unscrupulous enemy leaves no other recourse against the repetition of barbarous outrages."

Both Rogers and Bennett write that "[s]tate practice in the Second World War was characterised by, among other factors, the doctrine of belligerent reprisal."

Post-1945
After 1945, as a result of the general prohibition on use of force imposed by Article 2(4) of the United Nations Charter, armed reprisals in time of peace are no longer legal, but the possibility remains of non-armed reprisals (also known as countermeasures) as well as belligerent reprisals during hostilities when the law of international armed conflict (LOIAC) is violated.

In the case of belligerent reprisals, apart from the three factors in the Naulila case:
 a warning must also be issued beforehand;
 once the other party has stopped violation of LOIAC, belligerent reprisals must also be terminated;
 and the decision to engage in belligerent reprisals must be taken by a competent authority.

All four Geneva Conventions prohibit reprisals against, respectively, battlefield casualties, shipwreck survivors, prisoners of war, and protected persons (civilian or military), as well as certain buildings and property. The 1977 AP 1 defines what is an "indiscriminate attack". An additional 1977 protocol extends this to cover historic monuments, works of art, and places of worship.

According to Kenneth Anderson, restrictions on reprisal continue to restrict the circumstances in which it can be lawfully employed, and "[t]he trend... is to outlaw reprisal under all circumstances".

See also
Collective punishment
Letter of marque (license to hunt enemy ships and retake lost ships from the enemy)

References

Citations

Sources

Collective punishment
Law of war
Military doctrines